The 1919 Northwestern Purple team represented Northwestern University during the 1919 college football season. In their first and only year under head coach Charlie Bachman, the Purple compiled a 2–5 record (1–4 against Big Ten Conference opponents) and finished in eighth place in the Big Ten Conference.

Schedule

References

Northwestern
Northwestern Wildcats football seasons
Northwestern Purple football